Rim Zribi is a Tunisian actress.

Television 
 1999 - 2000 : Rih El Misk by Hamadi Arafa : Ibtissem
 2001 : Malla Ena (What Am I!) by Abdelkader Jerbi 
 2005 : Chaâbane fi Ramadhane by Selma Baccar : Zlaykha
 2006+2007+2008 : Choufli Hal (Find Me A solution Seasons 2-3-4–5) by Slaheddine Essid : Fayka named Foufa
 2012 :
 Bab El Hara 2100 by Haifa Mohamed Araar & Anis Ben Dali : Carlos' Mother
 Dar Louzir (The Minister's House) by Slaheddine Essid & Younes Ferhi
 2014 : Ayla Tounsia (A Tunisian Family) by Slimane Chaouche
 2015 : The Risk by Nasreddine Shili & Mohamed Ali Damak
 2017 : Dawama (The Whirlpool) by Naim Ben Rhouma, Mohamed Ali Mihoub & Abdelmonem Hwass
 2021 - 2022 : Ken Ya Makenech (Once Upon A Time) by Abdelhamid Bouchnak : Fedha

Theater 
 1982 : Sahra Taht El Soor, text by Samir Ayadi and director by Béchir Drissi and Hamadi Arafa
 2009 : Hira w Tchitine, text and director by Zouhair Erraies 
 2010 : Ija wahdek, director by Ikram Azzouz and Fethi Mselmani
 2011 : Ellil Zéhi, adaptation and director by Farhat Jedid
 2013 : Ahwal, text and staging by Mohamed Kouka
 2014 : 24h ultimatum, text by Jalel Eddine Saadi and director by Mongi Ben Hafsia
 2015 : Dhalamouni Habaybi, director by Abdelaziz Meherzi
 2016 : Cauchemar by Eugène Marin Labiche and director by Zouhair Erraies

References

External links

Tunisian film actresses
People from Tunis
Living people
20th-century Tunisian actresses
Year of birth missing (living people)